Home (also called Home City) is an unincorporated community in southern Franklin Township, Marshall County, Kansas, United States.  As of the 2020 census, the population of the community and nearby areas was 154.  It lies along U.S. Route 36 – the Pony Express Highway – and a Union Pacific rail line, east of the city of Marysville.

History
The community gets its name from the first post office, which was established in 1874 in someone's home. The post office eventually was moved to its own building, which is now facing possible closure due to postal service austerity measures.

Geography
Its altitude is 1,345 feet (410 m), and it is located at  (39.8416678, -96.5197389).

Demographics

For statistical purposes, the United States Census Bureau has defined this community as a census-designated place (CDP).

Education
The community is served by Marysville USD 364 public school district.

References

Further reading

External links
 Marshall County maps: Current, Historic, KDOT

Census-designated places in Marshall County, Kansas
Census-designated places in Kansas